Artemisia may refer to:

People
 Artemisia I of Caria (fl. 480 BC), queen of Halicarnassus under the First Persian Empire, naval commander during the second Persian invasion of Greece
 Artemisia II of Caria (died 350 BC), queen of Caria under the First Persian Empire, ordered the construction of the Mausoleum at Halicarnassus
 Artemisia Gentileschi (1593–1656/1653), Italian painter

Places
 Artemisia, Messinia, a Greek village west of Taygetus mountain in the Peloponnese
 Artemisia, Zakynthos, a municipality on Zakynthos, Greece
 Artemisia Geyser, in Yellowstone National Park, US
 Artemisia pipe, a diatreme in the Northwest Territories, Canada
 Kingdom of Artemisia, a regional designation created by the Society for Creative Anachronism

Opera
 Artemisia (Cavalli), a 1657 opera by Cavalli
 Artemisia, a 1754 opera seria by Johann Adolph Hasse
Artemisia, Regina di Caria, a 1797 opera by Domenico Cimarosa
 Artemisia (Cimarosa), an 1801 opera by Domenico Cimarosa

Other
 Artemisia (Rembrandt), a 1634 painting by Rembrandt
 Artemisia (ship), 1848, the first government immigrant ship to arrive in Moreton Bay, Queensland
 Artemisia (film), a 1997 French film about the Italian painter
 Artemisia (album), a 2007 album by the Dutch band Sun Caged
 Artemisia (plant), a genus of plants including the sagebrush and wormwood

See also 
 Artemisia asiatica (disambiguation)
 Artemisia of Caria (disambiguation)
 Artemia, a genus of brine shrimp
 Artemesia (disambiguation)
 Artemisa (disambiguation)
 Artemis (disambiguation)